The 2018 Galway Senior Football Championship is the 123rd edition of Galway GAA's premier Gaelic football tournament for senior graded clubs in County Galway, Ireland. The winners receive the Frank Fox Cup and represent Galway in the Connacht Senior Club Football Championship.

Twenty teams compete. This year there will be a new format. With the previous years 4 semi finalists being seeded and separated into 4 groups of 5

Corofin were the defending champions after they defeated Mountbellew/Moylough in the 2017 final.

This was Claregalways's return the senior grade after a 4 year exodus (they were relegated from the S.F.C. in 2013) when claiming the 2017 I.F.C. title.

Corofin retained their title with a win in a final replay over Mountbellew/Moylough. This was Corofin's sixth title in a row.

Caltra, Cortoon Shamrocks and Kilconly were relegated to the 2020 I.F.C. after 22, 15 and 7 years in the top-flight.

Team Changes
The following teams have changed division since the 2017 championship season.

To S.F.C.
Promoted from 2017 Galway Intermediate Football Championship
 Claregalway  -  (Intermediate Champions)

From S.F.C.
Relegated to 2018 Galway Intermediate Football Championship
 Micheál Breathnachs

Format

Group stage
2018 brings about a new format for the competition where there is 4 groups of 5 teams.
The 2017 Semi-finalists, Corofin, Mountbellew/Moylough, Annaghdown and Monivea/Abbey will be Seeded and placed in each Group. The remaining group places made up from the remaining 16 teams in an open draw. 
The top two teams in each group will qualify for the Knockout stage Quarter-finals. 
The third placed team in each group retains Senior Status for 2019.
The Bottom two teams in the group enter the Relegation Playoff.

If teams are level on points, the first deciding factor will be the head-to-head result between the sides; the second will be the points difference; and the third will be the scoring average.

Knockout stage
Quarter-finals will be an open draw where top placed group teams will play 2nd Placed group teams. However teams cannot be paired with the other team who qualified from their group.
Extra Time will be played in these games if required.

Semi-finals will be an open draw
Replays to be played in the semi-finals & final if required.
No Extra Time will be played in these games.

Relegation playoff
The four fourth placed teams are placed in an open draw, where the two winners will retain senior status for 2019.
The two losers will join the four bottom placed teams in the groups for the final series of play-off relegation games.

Two Groups of Three
Rd 1:    1 v 2
Rd 2:    Loser of 1 v 2 plays 3
Rd 3:    Winner of 1 v 2 plays 3

The top teams in the groups retains their Senior Status for the following year.
The two bottom teams in the groups are relegated to Intermediate for the following year.
The two second placed teams in the Relegation groups play-off with the loser being the third team to be relegated to Intermediate for 2019 and the winner retaining Senior status.

Group stages

Group 1

Round 1

Round 2

Round 3

Round 4

Round 5

Group 2

Round 1

Round 2

Round 3

Round 4

Round 5

Group 3

Round 1

Round 2

Round 3

Round 4

Round 5

Group 4

Round 1

Round 2

Round 3

Round 4

Round 5

Knockout stage

Quarter-finals
QF 1

QF 2

QF 3

QF 3 - Replay

QF 4

Semi-finals
Semi-final 1

Semi-final 2

Final

Final - Replay

Relegation playoffs

4th Placed Group Teams Playoff
Open Draw to take place between the 4 groups 4th placed teams. The two winners retaining Senior status for next years competition, and the losers then competing in the Relegation Group stage.
 
 Group 1 4th Placed Team - An Cheathrú Rua
 Group 2 4th Placed Team - Tuam Stars
 Group 3 4th Placed Team - Kilconly
 Group 4 4th Placed Team - St Michael's

Game 1

Game 2

Victories for both St Michael's and An Cheathrú Rua means that they retain their Senior status. Tuam Stars and Kilconly enter the relegation group stage

Relegation Group stage
Naomh Anna, Leitir Móir and Tuam Stars top their groups and retain their Senior status. 
Kilconly and Caltra finished bottom of their groups and will be relegated to compete in next years Intermediate competition. 
The two groups second placed teams, Cortoon Shamrocks and Barna, go into a relegation playoff game.

Group A

Game 1

Game 2

Game 3

Group B

Game 1

Game 2

Game 3

2nd Place Relegation Group Playoff
Relegation Playoff game played between the two 2nd placed Relegation group teams. Winner to retain Senior status for next years competition, and the loser relegated to next years Intermediate competition
Group A 2nd Placed Team - Cortoon Shamrocks
Group B 2nd Placed Team - Barna

2nd Place Relegation Group Playoff Replay

References

External links

Galway Senior Football Championship
Galway Senior Football Championship
Galway SFC